Emperor Fei of Jin (342 – November 23, 386), personal name Sima Yi, courtesy name Yanling, was an emperor of the Eastern Jin Dynasty in China. He was the younger brother (from the same mother) of Emperor Ai and later deposed by military leader Huan Wen.  The title that he is normally referred to, "Emperor Fei", is not a posthumous name as is usually the case with imperial common titles, but rather signified that he was deposed (with "Fei" meaning "depose").  He is also commonly known by the title he was given after his removal, Duke of Haixi.

Early life 
Sima Yi was born in 342, to Emperor Cheng and his concubine Consort Zhou, who was also the mother of his only brother, Sima Pi, who was one year older than he was.  Later in 342, Emperor Cheng grew gravely ill.  Typically, the throne would be passed down to a son, but Emperor Cheng's uncle Yu Bing, who wanted to control the government a little longer, suggested that since Jin was then facing the threat of Later Zhao, an older emperor was needed, and so persuaded Emperor Cheng to pass the throne to his younger brother Sima Yue the Prince of Langya, who was Yu Bing's nephew as well. Emperor Cheng agreed, and after his death, Sima Yue took the throne as Emperor Kang.  Emperor Kang created Sima Yi the Prince of Donghai on 1 August 342.

In Sima Yi's youth, he went through a progression of official ranks. While he was still the Prince of Donghai, he married Yu Bing's daughter Yu Daolian as his princess consort. In 361, after the death of his cousin Emperor Mu (Emperor Kang's son) on 10 July, his older brother Sima Pi took the throne as Emperor Ai on 13 July, and he took over the greater title of Prince of Langya which Emperor Ai had previously held, on 15 July.  In 365, after Emperor Ai died without a son, Sima Yi took the throne by decree of his aunt Empress Dowager Chu (Emperor Kang's wife).  He created his wife Princess Consort Yu empress.

Reign 
Even though Emperor Fei was an adult, he did not have actual power, as not only were governmental matters largely in the hands of his granduncle Sima Yu the Prince of Kuaiji, but Sima Yu himself was not fully able to make decisions, as the paramount general Huan Wen imposed many of his own decisions on the imperial government, which had no choice but to accept.

Immediately after Emperor Fei took the throne, the important city Luoyang (which had served as Jin's capital early in the dynasty's history) fell to Former Yan, because Emperor Ai's death prevented a relief force from being dispatched.

Late in 365, the general Sima Xun, the governor of Liang Province (梁州, modern southern Shaanxi) rebelled, but he was defeated, captured, and executed in summer 366.

In summer 366, Empress Yu died.  Emperor Fei would not have another empress for the rest of his reign.

In 369, Huan launched a major attack against Former Yan, advancing all the way to the vicinity of Former Yan's capital Yecheng, but hesitated at making a final assault on Yecheng, and was subsequently defeated by the Former Yan prince Murong Chui and Former Qin relief forces.

Huan, who had ambitions of usurpation and had intended to show off his power through conquering Former Yan until the campaign's failure, decided that he would show off his power in another way.  He plotted with his confidant Chi Chao to intimidate everyone by deposing Emperor Fei.  However, the emperor had been careful during his reign and had not had any major faults, so Huan figured he had to manufacture one.  He spread rumors that Emperor Fei was impotent and unable to bear children—and that his sons, by his concubines Consort Tian and Consort Meng, had in fact been biological sons of men that he favored, Xiang Long, Ji Hao, and Zhu Lingbao. (The rumors also implied a homosexual relationship between Emperor Fei and Xiang, Ji, and Zhu.) He then went to the capital and intimidated Empress Dowager Chu, to issue an edict that he had drafted deposing Emperor Fei.  He replaced Emperor Fei with his granduncle Sima Yu, who took the throne as Emperor Jianwen.  Emperor Fei was reduced in rank to Prince of Donghai, the title he had held for most of his life.  Huan put Consorts Tian and Meng to death, along with their sons.  He also massacred the powerful Yin and Yu clans.

After removal 
Huan Wen, however, wanted to further reduce the former emperor's rank, and he proposed that the prince be reduced to commoner status.  Empress Dowager Chu resisted, and only reduced his rank to Duke of Haixi.  Huan, apprehensive that the former emperor may try to return to the throne, had him exiled to Wu (吳縣, in modern Suzhou, Jiangsu) and put under heavy guard.

In winter 372, the Taoist agrarian rebel Lu Song claimed to have an edict from Empress Dowager Chu to restore Emperor Fei, and he sent a messenger to the duke to persuade him to join the rebellion.  Initially the duke believed him, but later realized that if the empress dowager wanted to restore him, she would send imperial guards to escort him, and therefore realized that there was no edict.  Without the duke's support, Lu's rebellion collapsed.

In exile, the former emperor constantly feared death, so he spent his time indulging drinking, music, and women, to show to Huan that he had no desire for political actions.  Whenever his concubines bore children, he would not dare to nurture them, but instead strangled them (so that he would not prove Huan wrong).  As this became evident, Huan began to relax the restrictions against him.  He died in 386 and was buried in Wu.  His wife, Empress Yu, was disinterred to be reburied with him.

Era names 
 Taihe (太和, tài hé): 28 January 366 – 6 January 372

Family
Consorts and Issue:
 Empress Xiao, of the Yu clan of Yingchuan (d. 366), first cousin once removed, personal name Daolian
 Meiren, of the Tian clan (d. 372)
 Unnamed son (d. 372)
 Unnamed son (d. 372)
 Meiren, of the Meng clan (d. 372)
 Unnamed son (d. 372)

Ancestry

References

 Book of Jin, vol. 8.
 Zizhi Tongjian, vols. 97, 101, 102, 103, 106.

342 births
386 deaths
Jin dynasty (266–420) emperors
4th-century Chinese monarchs